Joseph M. Monks (born February 21, 1968, Queens, New York, U.S.) is an American writer and the world's first visually impaired feature film director, best known for co-creating the cult phenomena horror comic book, Cry For Dawn.

Biography 
Monks, with fellow Queens-native Joseph Michael Linsner, co-created Cry For Dawn (1989–1992), an American horror comic book anthology. Linsner and Monks created Cry For Dawn Productions to publish the book; the publisher, based in Valley Stream, New York, also released other comics in the period 1989 to 1993. 

Cry For Dawn Productions dissolved in late 1993, and shortly thereafter Monks founded his own publishing company, known variously as CFD Productions, C.F.D. Productions, or CreativeForce Designs & Productions. With his new publisher, Monks became a driving force in independent horror comics, launching NightCry, Tales of the Dead, and several one-shots. Notable creators published by CFD included Dan Brereton (in That Chemical Reflex, 1994), Brian Michael Bendis (in Noir Quarterly, 1995), and John Cassaday (in No Profit for the Wise, 1996). Monks' own comics writing appeared in NightCry, In Rage and Tales of the Dead.

Monks closed down CFD Productions in 1997 and started up Chanting Monks Studios in 1998, launching titles such as The Night Terrors, also featuring Bernie Wrightson and William Stout; Gory Lori, a modern-day zombie apocalypse series illustrated by Jeff Salisbury and Mike Koneful; and the horror anthology Zacherley's Midnight Terrors, a tribute to TV horror host John Zacherle, with art by the likes of Basil Gogos, Ken Kelly, and William Stout.

In 2002, at age 33, Monks lost his sight as a result of diabetic retinopathy. In December of that year, he completed his first anthology of original fiction, Stuff Out'a My Head, released by Chanting Monks Press. The anthology featured illustrations by Bernie Wrightson and others.

In 2003, one of Monk's short stories, "Chance Meeting," was optioned for adaptation to the screen by Japanese publishing house Bunkasha in tandem with DK Publishing. Titled Flowers on the Razorwire: Chance Meeting, directed by Hart D. Fisher, the work was intended to be used as a Japanese television pilot but was instead released as a stand-alone DVD under CPI Home Video and Chanting Monks Press. Monks also appeared as an actor in the film, with his character being tortured by a dominatrix demanding he tell her a scary story.

In 2003–2004, Monks collaborated with Hart D. Fisher (and Fisher's publishing house Boneyard Press) on a number of projects.

Monk's story, "Shuteye", appeared in The Mammoth Book of Best Horror Comics (Running Press, 2008), and the New Horror Handbook (BearManor Media, May 2009) sports a chapter about his film work.

In 2010, Monks launched a Kickstarter crowdfunding project to complete The Bunker, his first feature film (the Kickstarter ran from August 1 to September 30, 2010). Kevin Smith and Ralph Garman talked about the project on their podcast Hollywood Babble-On and contributed the final funds needed to reach the goal. With The Bunker, Monk became the first blind feature film director. In 2013 The Bunker was released on DVD in the US via Commodity Films, and in Germany via Tom Cat Films.

In 2011, Monks received the Achievement in Cinema award at the Gasparilla International Film Festival. Tampa, Florida.

Bibliography

Books
Stuff Out'a My Head (Chanting Monks Press, 2002) 
Road Kills (Chanting Monks Press, 2003) — with Hart D. Fisher and Christa Faust
Sex Crimes (co-published by Boneyard Press & Chanting Monks, 2003)  — co-edited by Monks and Hart D. Fisher
Dead Meat (self-published anthology, 2012)
Torn to Pieces (MSI, 2012)

Film
Flowers on the Razorwire: Chance Meeting (Crime Pays, 2004) — written by Monks, directed by Hart D. Fisher
The Bunker (Sight Unseen Pictures, LLC, 2011) — written & directed by Monks
Redemption — written & directed by Monks

Comics
Cry for Dawn Volumes I through IV (Cry For Dawn Productions, 1989–1992)
Subtle Violents (Cry for Dawn Productions, 1991)
Villain & Hero (Cry for Dawn Productions, 1993)
In Rage (CFD Productions, 1994)
Nightcry (CFD Productions, 1994–1996)
Tales of the Dead (CFD Productions, 1994)
The Night Terrors (Chanting Monks Studios, 2000)
Gory Lori (Chanting Monks Studios, 2004)
Zacherley's Midnite Terrors (Chanting Monks Studios, 2004)

References

Notes

Sources

External links
SightUnseen Pictures
 

1968 births
American male writers
American horror writers
American comics writers
American film directors
American blind people
Living people